Jan Horvath (born 31 January 1958) is an American singer.

She was a member of the original Broadway company of The Phantom of the Opera where she performed the roles of Christine and Carlotta. Other Broadway credits include The Threepenny Opera starring Sting, Sweet Charity starring Debbie Allen, Stardust and Oliver!. In addition to her Broadway credits, Horvath sang the leading role of Grizabella in the National Touring Company of Cats. Off-Broadway credits include the Mother in Yoko Ono's New York Rock and Svetlana in the revised version of Chess. Horvath has performed with over 100 symphony orchestras around the world. Recently she has eschewed Broadway material for her own melodies and has recently completed work on her first solo CD, Never Too Late, an eclectic mix of musical styles and sentiments.

External links

Living people
1958 births